Bam Bam was an American pop group, created by the vocalist and multi-instrumentalist Chris Westbrook.

Biography
They had mainstream chart success in the United Kingdom during the 1980s with a single entitled "Give It To Me", which was released on the Serious record label. It entered the UK Singles Chart on March 19, 1988, and reached #65; it was in the chart for two weeks. Bam Bam went on to release several more records and remixes, and samples of their work appeared on many other tracks.

References

External links
Chris Westbrook on MySpace

American vocal groups
American house music groups